Paul Modrowski (born November 30, 1974) is an autistic, Polish-American man serving a life sentence for the murder of Dean Fawcett. From 2009 to 2015 Modrowski produced a prison blog titled "Paul Modrowski- On the Inside", which was featured in a four-part series of episodes of the Reply All podcast in 2016.

Background
In late 1992, Modrowski had a falling out with his father and moved in with Robert Faraci and his then-wife Rose. Faraci, Modrowski, Fawcett and a few others allegedly took part in a check kiting scheme, where they bounced checks against an account that had been opened with a minimal deposit. Faraci had a lengthy prior criminal record, which included prison time for charges of forgery and drug use.

On January 18, 1993, a woman and her daughter discovered a human body missing its head, left arm and right hand, along the railroad tracks in Barrington, Illinois. Through a note found in the victim's clothing containing two phone numbers, the corpse was identified as Dean Fawcett, who had gone missing in late December 1992 and Modrowski and Faraci were identified as suspects.

A few days before Fawcett's body was discovered, Modrowski and the Faracis had relocated to Clearwater, Florida; where they resided for two months, before returning to Illinois in March 1993. At this point, Modrowski ceased living with the Faracis and began residing with his grandparents in Southwestern Chicago, up until his arrest. On April 22, 1993, Robert Faraci was arrested for the murder of Dean Fawcett. Afterwards Faraci and his then-wife alleged Modrowski committed the crime. They also named Modrowski as the perpetrator in the nearby Brown's Chicken massacre, which had occurred on January 8, 1993.

Modrowski was arrested on an unrelated burglary charge on April 28, 1993, and, after being interrogated by police, was charged as a second suspect in the Dean Fawcett murder.

It was initially alleged that Modrowski was also responsible for the Brown's Chicken massacre, due to the proximity, timing and brutal nature of the two crimes. Although Modrowski was never charged in the Brown's Chicken murders, he remained a prime suspect, until the arrest of Juan Luna and James Degorski in 2002.

Murder of Dean Fawcett
Faraci and Modrowski were both tried for the murder of Dean Fawcett by two separate juries. The prosecution argued that the three men were involved in a check writing scheme and that Fawcett was murdered on the night of December 28, 1992, after threatening to come forward to police. It is believed that Fawcett was shot in the head, then his body was dismembered in an effort to prevent identification - Fawcett's head and missing limbs were never located. Both men were tried for the murder. Officer John Robertson testified that Modrowski confessed to lending Faraci his car to carry out the murder. Modrowski denies this in his blog. Modrowski says that he was at the home of his sister the night Fawcett was murdered.

Modrowski also claims that his defense attorney William Von Hoene refused to dispute Robertson's testimony and did not allow any witnesses to testify on his behalf (including Modrowski's sister who reports that Modrowski was with her the night of the murder). Van Hoene also did not reveal Modrowski's diagnosis of autism to the jury. Modrowski has made allegations that this led jury members to mistake his awkward body language, lack of eye contact and aloofness as lack of remorse and proven guilt. Rose Faraci admitted in court to lying to authorities in an attempt to direct blame away from her then-husband and towards Modrowkski and a friend.

Modrowski and Faraci were tried at the same time in one courtroom. Each defendant had his own separate jury and each jury was brought in and out of the courtroom based on the testimony that would be presented. The jury hearing the case against Faraci found him not guilty. Two days later, Modrowski's jury found Modrowski guilty of murder, determining that his statements to police proved his accountability. On April 27, 1995, Modrowski was sentenced to life in prison without the possibility of parole by Associate Cook County Judge Sam Amirante, who told Modrowski, "I am going to give you the same hope that you gave to (Fawcett): no hope. ... You deserve the term of natural life in prison."

Prison blog 
From 2009 to 2015, Modrowski produced a blog from prison. Modrowski, having not experienced the internet, would mail written letters to his mother, which she would then transcribe for the blog. In 2015, it was shut down due to disagreements with his mother on the changes made, particularly over religious disputes; Modrowski considered himself an atheist, which she refused to acknowledge and directly omitted from any of his writings.

Appeals 

Following his 1995 conviction, Modrowski exhausted all of his regular set of appeals without success. His appeals were filed without supporting documents or affidavits and his final appeal to the highest supreme court was filed one day late.

After exhausting his regular set of appeals, Modrowski filed five unsuccessful clemency petitions to the Governor of Illinois. He recently submitted his sixth clemency petition and is also seeking out a post-conviction appeal through legal counsel and the University of Illinois Innocence Project, in which he requests to have his DNA tested.

References

External links
 

1974 births
Living people
American bloggers
American people convicted of murder
American prisoners sentenced to life imprisonment
People convicted of murder by Illinois
Prisoners sentenced to life imprisonment by Illinois